Walter Nangle (c.1630 – 1693) was an Irish Jacobite politician and soldier.

Nangle was the son of Jocelyn Nangle and Elinor Cusack. In 1689, he was elected as a Member of Parliament for Trim in the short-lived Patriot Parliament summoned by James II of England. During the Williamite War in Ireland, he was a captain in King James' Regiment of Infantry. He was attainted in 1691, forfeiting his 668-acre estate in County Meath.

References

Year of birth uncertain
1693 deaths
17th-century Irish people
Irish Jacobites
Irish MPs 1689
Irish soldiers in the army of James II of England
Members of the Parliament of Ireland (pre-1801) for County Meath constituencies
People convicted under a bill of attainder